A64FX could refer to 2 different microprocessors:
 the 2003 AMD Athlon 64 processor
 the 2019 Fujitsu A64FX processor